Mayéyé is a district in the Lékoumou Department of Republic of the Congo.

References 

Lékoumou Department
Districts of the Republic of the Congo